Rubén García Santos (born 14 July 1993) is a Spanish professional footballer who plays for CA Osasuna as a left winger.

Club career

Levante
Born in Valencia, Valencian Community, García graduated from local Levante UD's youth system, making his senior debut with the reserves in the Tercera División. In 2011, he was linked with a move back to Valencia CF, but a deal could not be reached; the following 31 January, he signed a professional contract until 2016.

On 2 September 2012, García made his first La Liga appearance, coming on as a substitute for Nabil El Zhar in a 3–2 home win over RCD Espanyol. On 21 October, in the same competition, he provided an assist to Míchel for the game's only goal against Getafe CF.

García scored his first top-division goal on 9 December 2012, the third of a 4–0 home defeat of RCD Mallorca. He was permanently promoted to the first team in January 2013, being assigned the number 11.

On 28 July 2017, after contributing 17 scoreless appearances to a promotion to the top flight, García was loaned to Segunda División club Sporting de Gijón for one year.

Osasuna
On 20 August 2018, García agreed to a three-year deal at fellow second-tier CA Osasuna on a free transfer – Levante also retained 50% of the player's federative rights. The following 21 June, after helping them to achieve promotion as champions, he was bought outright and extended his contract at the El Sadar Stadium until 2023.

International career
On 19 January 2012, García was called to train with the Spain under-19 side.

Career statistics

Club

Honours
Levante
Segunda División: 2016–17

Osasuna
Segunda División: 2018–19

References

External links
Levante official profile 

1993 births
Living people
Spanish footballers
Footballers from Valencia (city)
Association football wingers
La Liga players
Segunda División players
Segunda División B players
Tercera División players
Atlético Levante UD players
Levante UD footballers
Sporting de Gijón players
CA Osasuna players
Spain youth international footballers
Spain under-21 international footballers